The Cathedral of Saint Volodymyr the Great, in the 6th arrondissement of Paris, is the cathedral church of the Ukrainian Catholic Eparchy of Saint Wladimir-Le-Grand de Paris in France.  The eparchial bishop of the eparchy has been Borys Gudziak since 2012.

See also
Catholic Church
Ukrainian Greek Catholic Church

External links
 GCatholic.org information
 home page of the cathedral

Ukrainian Catholic cathedrals
Eastern Catholic cathedrals in France
Ukrainian
Buildings and structures in the 6th arrondissement of Paris
Cathedrals in Paris
19th-century Roman Catholic church buildings in France
Ukrainian diaspora in Europe